Annette Yoshiko Reed (born April 13, 1973) is an American religious historian. She is currently a Professor in the Skirball Department of Hebrew and Judaic Studies and Department of Religious Studies at New York University. Reed's research interests span the topics of Second Temple Judaism, early Christianity, and Jewish/Christian relations in Late Antiquity, with particular attention to retheorizing religion, identity, difference, and forgetting. She is the daughter of political scientist Steven Reed.

Education 

Reed received her B.A. (with First Class Honours) from McGill University in 1997. Subsequently, she completed an M.T.S. from Harvard University's Divinity School in 1999. She then received both an M.A. (2001) and a Ph.D. (2002) from Princeton University, where she studied with Martha Himmelfarb, Peter Schäfer, John Gager, and Elaine Pagels.

Teaching and Research 
Reed began her teaching career in the Department of Religious Studies at McMaster University (2003–2007) before moving to the Department of Religious Studies at the University of Pennsylvania (2007–2017). During her time at the University of Pennsylvania, she served as coordinator of the Philadelphia Seminar of Christian Origins as well as Director of the Center for Ancient Studies. She has held multiple fellowships at the Katz Center for Advanced Judaic Studies. In 2017, she joined the faculty of the Skirball Department of Hebrew and Judaic Studies and Department of Religious Studies at NYU. From July 2021, she will be Professor of New Testament and Early Christianity at Harvard University's Divinity School. 

Reed is a member of the Editorial Board of the book series Texts and Studies in Ancient Judaism (TSAJ), published by Mohr Siebeck, with Seth Schwartz, Azzan Yadin, and Marin Niehoff. In 2018, she delivered the prestigious 2018 Taubman Lecture Series at the University of California, Berkeley. Her 2020 monograph, Demons, Angels, and Writing in Ancient Judaism, was a finalist for the Jewish Book Council's Nahum M. Sarna Memorial Award. In 2020, she was awarded an American Council of Learned Societies fellowship for her project, "Forgetting: Retheorizing the Ancient Jewish Past and its Jewish and Christian Reception."

She has written popular online pieces for Salon, Religion Dispatches, and The Immanent Frame. She has spoken about her work at the Museum of Modern Art (MoMA),
, Franklin Institute, and Penn Museum, as well as at many universities, churches, and synagogues.

Select Works

Monographs 
 Demons, Angels, and Writing in Ancient Judaism. Cambridge: Cambridge University Press, 2020.
 Enoch from Antiquity to the Middle Ages (with John Reeves). Oxford: Oxford University, 2018.
 Jewish-Christianity and the History of Judaism. TSAJ 171. Tübingen: Mohr Siebeck, 2018. Paperback reprint: Fortress, 2022.
 Fallen Angels and the History of Judaism and Christianity: The Reception of Enochic Literature. Cambridge: Cambridge University Press, 2005.

Edited Volumes 
 Envisioning Judaism: Essays in Honor of Peter Schäfer on the Occasion of his Seventieth Birthday. Edited with Ra’anan S. Boustan, Klaus Herrmann, Reimund Leicht, and Giuseppe Veltri, with the collaboration of Alex Ramos. 2 vols. Tübingen: Mohr Siebeck, 2013
 Jews, Christians, and the Roman Empire: The Poetics of Power in Late Antiquity. Edited with Natalie B. Dohrmann. Jewish Culture and Contexts. Philadelphia : University of Pennsylvania Press, 2013.
 Blood and the Boundaries of Jewish and Christian Identities in Late Antiquity. Edited with Raʻanan S. Boustan. Henoch 30.2 (2008).
 Heavenly Realms and Earthly Realities in Late Antique Religions. Edited with Raʻanan S. Boustan. Cambridge: Cambridge University Press, 2004.
 The Ways that Never Parted: Jews and Christians in Late Antiquity and the Early Middle Ages. Edited with Adam H. Becker. TSAJ 95. Tübingen: Mohr Siebeck, 2003. Paperback reprint: Fortress, 2005.

References

External links 
 NYU Faculty Profile
 Annette Y. Reed, Academia.Edu
 Amie Montemurro, "Art of the Forgotten: HDS Interview with Annette Yoshiko Reed," HDS Dean's Report, November 4, 2021
 Richard Newton, "The Interview: The 2020 Aronov Lecture with Dr. Annette Yoshiko Reed," Bulletin for the Study of Religion, vol. 50 no. 2 (2021) 42-49

McGill University alumni
Harvard University alumni
Princeton University alumni
New York University faculty
Living people
1973 births
American religion academics
Religious studies scholars